Clematis fremontii is a species of flowering plant in the buttercup family known as Fremont's leather flower. It is endemic to the United States where it is known from several disjunct populations throughout the central and southeastern states. Previously unknown populations were discovered in the mid-2000s in Tennessee and Georgia. Other names for this plant include Fremont's crowsfoot, Fremont's leather-plant, leatherplant, and rattleweed.

Description
The inflorescence is a single urn-shaped flower. The flower has hairy bluish or purple lance-shaped sepals with greenish tips. The fruits are long achenes borne in a cluster.

This plant is generally found on limestone soils in glades and prairies. It is sometimes planted in gardens.

References

fremontii
Flora of the United States